Jan O. Henriksen (3 May 1945 – 26 August 2018) was a Norwegian illustrator and editorial cartoonist.

Born in Andøya, a self-trained artist, Henriksen worked as illustrator and cartoonist for Adresseavisen from 1966 to 1967, for Fædrelandsvennen from 1967 to 1974, for Aftenposten from 1985 to 1987, and for Adresseavisen from 1987. He illustrated a number of books, including humour books by the signature Tande-P, and his cartoon series Nazismens fremvekst/Norge i krig was published in 1981 and 1982.

He died in Trondheim on 26 August 2018, 73 years old.

Selected works

References

1945 births
2018 deaths
People from Andøy
Norwegian illustrators
Norwegian caricaturists
Norwegian editorial cartoonists
20th-century Norwegian artists
21st-century Norwegian artists
Norwegian male artists
20th-century Norwegian male artists
21st-century Norwegian male artists